Erwin Stricker (15 August 1950 – 28 September 2010) was an Italian alpine skier who competed in the 1972 Winter Olympics and 1976 Winter Olympics.

Nicknamed Cavallo pazzo (in English Crazy horse) for his exuberant style, Stricker was the first skier after Karl Schranz and Jean-Claude Killy to enter the first group of merit of all the specialties foreseen at his time (downhill, giant slalom and special slalom).

Biography
Although born in Austria, Stricker’s family was originally from Brixen, where he lived most of his life.

World Cup results
Podium

References

External links
 

1950 births
2010 deaths
People from Braunau am Inn District
Olympic alpine skiers of Italy
Italian male alpine skiers
Alpine skiers at the 1972 Winter Olympics
Alpine skiers at the 1976 Winter Olympics
Alpine skiers of Centro Sportivo Carabinieri
Sportspeople from Brixen